Robert A. Stebbins is an author, researcher and an academic. He is Professor Emeritus at University of Calgary and Associate Editor for Leisure and Voluntaristics Review: Brill Research Perspectives.

Stebbins has published more than 300 research articles and is the author of 60 books and monographs. Most of his work in leisure studies has centered on amateurs, hobbyists, career volunteers, serious and casual leisure and the serious leisure perspective.

Stebbins is the former President of Canadian Sociology and Anthropology Association and Social Science Federation of Canada. He is the recipient of Outstanding Contribution Award by Canadian Sociology and Anthropology Association and Marguerite Dentinger Prize by ACFA. He was elected Fellow of the Royal Society of Canada in 1999.

Education 
Stebbins did his bachelor's degree from Macalester College in 1961 and then completed his master's degree and doctoral studies in sociology from University of Minnesota in 1962 and 1964 respectively.

Career 
Right after his Ph.D., Stebbins was appointed as associate professor of sociology at Presbyterian College, where he taught for a year before teaching at Memorial University of Newfoundland as an Assistant Professor from 1965 till 1968. For the next three years, Stebbins served as associate professor and head of the Department of Sociology and Anthropology and then taught as a professor from 1971 till 1973. He joined University of Texas at Arlington as a professor of sociology for a three-year term. In 1976, Stebbins moved from the US to Canada and joined University of Calgary as head of the Department of Sociology till 1982 and then taught as a professor till 1999. In 2000, he was promoted to faculty professor and then to professor emeritus of sociology.

Stebbins served as president of the Canadian Sociology and Anthropology Association from 1987 till 1990 and Social Science Federation of Canada from 1990 till 1993. From 1997 till 2002, Stebbins was associated with World Leisure and Recreation Association (WLRA) as a board director. He became a senior fellow of the World Leisure Academy and vice president of the Research Committee 13 (sociology of leisure) at International Sociological Association in 2010.

Research and work 
Stebbins has conducted extensive qualitative research on humor, work, leisure, the work and leisure dimensions of deviance, and the leisure basis of francophone communities outside Quebec. Most of his work in leisure studies has centered on amateurs, hobbyists, career volunteers, serious and casual leisure and the serious leisure perspective (SLP), which is a term he coined in 1982 and elaborated in 2007. Since the beginning of his career, Stebbin's work has focused on developing a grounded theory of leisure of all types.
 
A research sub-area that Stebbins most worked on is amateur musicians. He authored an article in 1969 about jazz musicians and role distance behavior. The purpose of this paper was to counter the confusion and vagueness associated with the concept of role distance. He proposed a comprehensive definition of role distance and explained the concept and kinds of role distance behaviors and elaborated these concepts by observing the role distance behaviors in jazz musicians. In 1978, Stebbins researched about the creation of high culture and the role of American amateur classical musician. He explainsed the interplay of high culture with the other three types of culture and studies jazz amateurs’ interaction with jazz professionals to explain the professional-amateur-public system. He proposes a new method to analyze high cultures. Another crucial research area of Stebbins is serious leisure perspective. Since this was a term he coined himself, he published an article in 1982 explaining the term. He describes serious pleasure as the main paths people take to achieve their full potential. He explains the main types of serious leisure perspective and in another article, relates SLP with dabbling. He examines dabbling in detail and also explains its role in creating a career in music and other serious pastimes.

Most of Stebbins research is consolidated and published as books. He has authored more than 50 books and monographs. In 1971, he published ‘Commitment to Deviance: The Nonprofessional Criminal in the Community’ which was reviewed in Social Forces as a book that is “useful not only to those interested in the study of deviance, but those interested in the idea of commitment as a means of studying any kind of behavior.” In the review, the book is also recommended to “professions which deal with the problems of publicly labeled deviants”. Stebbins published “Amateurs: On the Margin Between Work and Leisure” in 1979. This book sheds light to three amateur communities and shows the features of amateur perspective. Marianne Gosztonyi Ainley from University of Chicago Press Journals writes that the author “offers useful definitions for amateurs and professionals” and that “Much of the subsequent text is sociologically minded.” In 1991, Lori V. Morris reviews Stebbins book “The Laugh-Makers: Stand-Up Comedy as Art, Business, and Life-Style.”, and writes that the book “attempts to cover a lot of ground”. She further states that “Anyone with a fan's curiosity about comedians would likely find this book interesting.” In 1996, Stebbins published a book called “The Barbershop Singer: Inside the Social World of a Musical Hobby”. Stan Parker from University of Brighton calls the book “short but highly readable” and writes that the idea of the book is “well worth holding on to.”

In The Serious Leisure Perspective (2020) Stebbins provides a synthesis of the 47 years of work on the SLP. The perspective’s growth has been fostered by its own website, established in 2006 in collaboration with Jenna Hartel.

Of his 60 books published or in press, most center exclusively or substantially on one aspect or another of serious, casual, and project-based leisure.

Awards and honors 
1996 – Elected Fellow, Academy of Leisure Sciences
1996 - Distinguished Research Award, University of Calgary
1997 - Outstanding Contribution Award, Canadian Sociology and Anthropology Association
1999 – Elected Fellow, Royal Society of Canada
2003 - Marguerite Dentinger Prize, ACFA
2010 - Elected Senior Fellow and Founding Member, World Leisure Academy
2019 - Honorary Lifetime Member of the Leisure Studies Association

References 

Academic staff of the University of Calgary
Living people
Macalester College alumni
University of Minnesota College of Liberal Arts alumni
1938 births